José Carlos Silveira Braga, known as Brandãozinho (24 January 1930 – 5 January 2021) was a Brazilian professional footballer who played as a forward for clubs in Brazil, France, and Spain.

Career
Born in Boa Esperança do Sul, Brandãozinho played for Paulista de São Carlos, Jabaquara, Palmeiras (with whom he won the Torneio Rio – São Paulo in 1951), Santos, Monaco, Nice, Celta Vigo, Espanyol and Real Oviedo.

Brandãozinho died in Araraquara on 5 January 2021, aged 90.

References

1930 births
2021 deaths
Brazilian footballers
Jabaquara Atlético Clube players
Sociedade Esportiva Palmeiras players
Santos FC players
AS Monaco FC players
OGC Nice players
RC Celta de Vigo players
Real Oviedo players
RCD Espanyol footballers
Brazilian expatriate footballers
Brazilian expatriates in France
Brazilian expatriate sportspeople in France
Brazilian expatriate sportspeople in Spain
Expatriate footballers in Spain
La Liga players
Segunda División players
Association football forwards